Otta Station is a railway station located in the town of Otta in Sel, Norway. The station is located on the Dovre Line and served by express trains to Oslo and Trondheim. The station was opened in 1896 when the Dovre Line was extended from Tretten Station to Otta.

The restaurant was taken over by Norsk Spisevognselskap on 1 October 1924. It retained an all-year operation until 30 September 1928, when the restaurant was closed for the winter season. It opened again in May and retained the summer-only service. The operation was later privatized.

References

Railway stations in Oppland
Railway stations on the Dovre Line
Railway stations opened in 1896
1896 establishments in Norway
Sel